Skiptracing is the process of locating a person's whereabouts.  Skip tracing tactics may be employed by a skip tracer, contact tracer (in a public health context), debt collector, process server, bail bondsman or bail agency enforcer (bounty hunter), repossession agent, bail enforcement agent, private investigator, lawyer, police detective, journalist, stalker or by any person attempting to locate a subject whose contact information is not immediately known. Similar techniques have also been used by investigators to locate witnesses in criminal trials.

Terminology
Other terms include to skip trace, or debtor and fugitive recovery. A skip tracer is someone who performs this task, which may be the person's primary occupation. The term "skip" (as a noun) refers to the person being searched for, and is derived from the idiomatic expression "to skip town", meaning to depart (perhaps in a rush or perhaps hoping to elude creditors or law enforcement). As such, the skip tracers need to track down ("trace") the "skip" to their new location. The term "skip" is "attested by mid-14c. as "to run, go, rush, flee," also "to make off, hasten away."

Methods
Skip tracing is performed in stages. The first step is gather the basic information about the subject, such as first, middle, and last name, variants (e.g. Robert may go by "Rob"), aliases, and nicknames. The subject's 
date of birth, last known physical addresses, email addresses, and phone numbers are also important. The subject's social media pages may yield clues about their whereabouts. The skip tracer also gathers historical information such as the names of schools they attended, as this can generate leads about friends who might know their whereabouts. As well, skip tracers gather information about the subject's friends, family and business associates. 

Then the skip tracer will start collecting as much information as possible about the subject using Internet searches, databases, public records, and their network of contacts. Often, the job becomes more than research since one must often employ methods of social engineering, which involves calling or visiting former neighbors, or other known contacts to ask about the subject, sometimes under false or misleading pretenses. 

Records or Information that "skiptracers" use may include phone number databases, credit reports (including information provided on a loan application, credit card application, and in other debt collector databases), job application information, criminal background checks, utility bills (electricity, gas, water, sewage, phone, internet, and cable), social security, disability, and public tax information. While some of these records may be publicly available, some cannot be accessed without an appropriate search warrant, or a specific permissible purpose, which is generally only available to financial institutions, their contracted third-party vendors, law enforcement or licensed private investigators.

Even when no specific information is returned, public and private databases exist that cross-reference skiptracing information with others the "skip" may have lived with in the recent past. For instance, if previous records show a "skip" lived in the same house as a third party, the third party may also be skiptraced in an effort to locate the primary target.

The next step is to verify the information. The information is then analyzed and verified, which eliminates some of the leads as outdated or associated with the wrong person. Sometimes the subject's current whereabouts are in the data, but are obfuscated by the sheer amount of information or disinformation. 

In the past skip tracing used to include things like dumpster diving and pretext calls to utility companies. Currently, skip tracing is largely conducted online using paid databases and phone calls to gather and verify information. Modern social media platforms such as Facebook have greatly simplified skip tracing work.

See also 
 Doxing

References

Surveillance
Legal action
Law enforcement